Nazareth Academy may refer to:

India
Nazareth Academy, Gaya

United States
Nazareth Academy (La Grange Park, Illinois)
Nazareth Academy (Kentucky), now Spalding University
Nazareth Academy (Wakefield, Massachusetts)
Nazareth Academy (Rochester, New York)
Nazareth Academy (Parma Heights, Ohio), of the Roman Catholic Diocese of Cleveland
Nazareth Academy High School, Philadelphia, Pennsylvania

See also

Nazareth College (disambiguation)